Laven station is a railway station serving the railway town of Laven in East Jutland, Denmark.

The station is located on the Skanderborg–Skjern railway line from Skanderborg to Skjern. The station opened on 2 May 1871 with the Skanderborg-Silkeborg section of the Skanderborg-Skjern railway. The train services are currently operated by Arriva which run frequent regional train services between Aarhus and Herning.

Architecture 
The station building was designed by the Danish architect Niels Peder Christian Holsøe. The station building has later been torn down.

See also 
 List of railway stations in Denmark

References

Bibliography

External links

 Banedanmark – government agency responsible for maintenance and traffic control of most of the Danish railway network
 Arriva – British multinational public transport company operating bus and train services in Denmark
 Danske Jernbaner – website with information on railway history in Denmark

Railway stations in the Central Denmark Region
Railway stations opened in 1871
Buildings and structures in Silkeborg Municipality
Railway stations in Denmark opened in the 19th century